Muallaf is a 2008 Malaysian drama film directed by Yasmin Ahmad. It tells a tale of three souls finding solace in religion. This is Yasmin Ahmad's fifth film after Rabun, Sepet, Gubra and Mukhsin.

Cast

Footnote:
  Brian Yap's character was initially planned to be named Robert Ng.

Closure
 It was not clear what had happened to Rohana. However, it could be assumed that Rohani had finally met up with Rohana considering that she had volunteered to take care of her stroke-hit father who had snatched away Rohana earlier.
 It was not shown explicitly whether Brian was attracted to Rohani or the religion of Islam itself. If Brian was in love with Rohani, this would probably mark the first time Yasmin concealed the romantic relationship in films that contain the agenda of love.

Screening
As Yasmin's previous films, Muallaf opened with the usual Islamic verse "In the name of God, the most Gracious and most Merciful" (Bismillahirahmanirrahim). What set Muallaf apart from her previous works was that the verse was displayed in Chinese in this movie, i.e. "奉大仁大慈真主的尊名" (Pinyin: fèng dà rén dà cí Zhēn Zhǔ de zūn míng). It was understood that the verse would be displayed in Tamil in her next film, Talentime.

As Yasmin's second feature film, Sepet, Muallaf was first screened in Singapore instead of Malaysia, where it was shot. The film ran for 4 weeks in Singapore from 27 November to 24 December 2008, recording turnouts more than that of Sepet. Muallaf was first denied screening in Malaysian cinemas due to the Malaysian censorship authorities request of key scenes to be cut, thus rendering the story meaningless. However, 1 year later, Muallaf finally opened in Malaysia nationwide on 24/12/09 with a few dialogues muted.

International participation

Awards won
 21st Tokyo International Film Festival (18 - 26 October 2008) ~ Special Mention Best Asian-Middle Eastern Film
 2010 Screen Awards - Best Film & Best Actress in a Leading Role (Sharifah Amani)

Official selection
 61st Locarno International Film Festival (6 - 16 August 2008)
 13th Pusan International Film Festival (2 - 10 October 2008)
 Rialto Film Festival, Amsterdam - New Malaysian Cinema

Reviews and Interviews with Yasmin Ahmad on the film
Singapore
 RazorTV Interview with Yasmin Ahmad on Muallaf (part 1)
 RazorTV Interview with Yasmin Ahmad on Muallaf (part 2)
 Moviexclusive.com
 Lianhe Zaobao (24 November 2008): 马国电影《皈依》男主角原属意光良(Malaysian film Muallaf male lead originally for Michael Wong)
 Lianhae Zaobao (28 November 2008): 《改心》马来姐妹花逃家 (Muallaf: Two Malay sisters on the run)
 TODAY (29 November 2008): Much ado about Muallaf

Indonesia
 Rumah Film: Saya Membuat Film Karena Ingin Memahami Tuhan(I Make Films Because I Want To Understand God)
 Rumah Film: Muallaf: Brian dan Sepasang Gadis Ronin (Brian and A Pair of Girls on the Run)

Malaysia
 Cinema Online: Muallaf Review''
 TUPAI: Ulasan Muallaf

References

External links

2008 films
2008 drama films
Films directed by Yasmin Ahmad
Malaysian drama films
Malay-language films
Chinese-language Malaysian films
Cantonese-language Malaysian films
2000s English-language films